The Cap-Haitien least gecko (Sphaerodactylus lazelli ) is a species of lizard in the family Sphaerodactylidae. The species is endemic to Haiti.

Etymology
The specific name, lazelli, is in honor of American herpetologist James Draper "Skip" Lazell, Jr. (born 1939).

Habitat
The preferred habitat of S. lazelli is forest at sea level.

Description

Reproduction
S. lazelli is oviparous.

References

Further reading
Rösler H (2000). "Kommentierte Liste der rezent, subrezent und fossil bekannten Geckotaxa (Reptilia: Gekkonomorpha) ". Gekkota 2: 28–153. (Sphaerodactylus lazelli, p. 112). (in German).
Schwartz A (1983). "Part 1. Sphaerodactylus difficilis, S. clenchi, and S. lazelli ". pp. 5–30. In: Schwartz A, Thomas R (1983). "The difficilis complex of Sphaerodactylus (Sauria, Gekkonidae) of Hispaniola". Bulletin of Carnegie Museum of Natural History (22): 1-60.
Schwartz A, Henderson RW (1991). Amphibians and Reptiles of the West Indies: Descriptions, Distributions, and Natural History. Gainesville, Florida: University of Florida Press. 720 pp. . (Sphaerodactylus lazelli, p. 502).
Schwartz A, Thomas R (1975). A Check-list of West Indian Amphibians and Reptiles. Carnegie Museum of Natural History Special Publication No. 1. Pittsburgh, Pennsylvania: Carnegie Museum of Natural History. 216 pp. (Sphaerodactylus lazelli, p. 153).
Shreve B (1968). "The notatus group of Sphaerodactylus (Sauria, Gekkonidae) in Hispaniola". Breviora (280): 1-28. (Sphaerodactylus lazelli, new species, pp. 8–10).

Sphaerodactylus
Reptiles of Haiti
Endemic fauna of Haiti
Reptiles described in 1968